Cameron Crockett Snyder (October 9, 1916 – January 29, 2010) was an American sportswriter for The Baltimore Sun. He was awarded the Dick McCann Memorial Award in 1982.

Background
Snyder was born in Rippon, West Virginia to Burnell C. and Evelyne M. Snyder. He was raised in Baltimore where he  attended Calvert Hall College.

Snyder was a college football player at Drexel University, graduating in 1941. In August of that year he was drafted into the army, serving in the China Burma India Theater.

Career
When he finished college in 1941, Snyder was offered a tryout with the Chicago Bears but was drafted into the Army. He served five years, in a mountain infantry unit that served in India, China and Burma, rising from private to captain.

Snyder was originally hired by The Baltimore Sun in 1953 where he covered the Baltimore Colts until his retirement in 1986. In 1982 he was admitted into the "writer's wing" of the Pro Football Hall of Fame by the Pro Football Writers Association.

Death
Snyder died at his home in Fullerton, Maryland, aged 93, from lung cancer.

References

1916 births
2010 deaths
Military personnel from West Virginia
United States Army personnel of World War II
Calvert Hall College High School alumni
Deaths from cancer in Maryland
Deaths from lung cancer
Dick McCann Memorial Award recipients
Drexel University alumni
People from Jefferson County, West Virginia
Writers from Baltimore
Sportswriters from Maryland
Sportswriters from West Virginia
United States Army officers